Maconcourt is a commune in the Vosges department in Grand Est in northeastern France.

Inhabitants are known as  Maconcurtiens.

Geography
Maconcourt is a rural village that retains many traditional features. It is positioned on the northern edge of the department, adjacent to the Meurthe-et-Moselle department, some forty-five kilometres (twenty-nine miles) to the northwest of Épinal and fifty kilometres to the south-southwest of Nancy in the Upper Santois district.   The Autoroute A31 runs south-north some six kilometres (four miles) to the west of the village, although in order to access this autoroute it is necessary to drive further, to Houécourt.

See also
Communes of the Vosges department

References

Communes of Vosges (department)